Wuliangye Yibin Company Limited is a Chinese alcoholic beverage company. It specializes in manufacturing baijiu, and is best known for Wuliangye, made from five organic grains: Proso millet, corn, glutinous rice, long grain rice and wheat.
 
Its other trademark liquor spirits offerings include Tiandichun, Wuliangchun, Wuliangshen, Changsanjiao, Jinliufu, Laozuofang, Liuyanghe, Lianghuchun, and Xiandairen. Wuliangye and Tiandichun are aromatic baijius.

Headquartered in Yibin, Sichuan Province, the company distributes its products all over the domestic market, and exports to overseas markets. As of 31 December 2007, the company has eight major subsidiaries.

Market share 
According to an article named "Pouring a Big One" posted in the May 2008 edition of China Economic Review, Vin & Sprit (V&S) states that baijiu is the world's most popular spirit, with annual sales volume of 520 million 9-liter cases compared to vodka with 497 million 9-liter cases.

In this article, Wuliangye is reported to rank first in terms of market share compared with other baijiu brands. The following is a list of baijiu brands with their respective market share.

 Wuliangye Yibin (五粮液) 45%
 Kweichow Moutai (贵州茅台) 30%
 Guojiao 1573 (国窖 1573) or National Cellar 1573 10%
 Shuijingfang (水井坊) 10%
 Others 5%

References

External links 
Company website
Google Finance profile

Companies listed on the Shenzhen Stock Exchange
Companies based in Sichuan
Food and drink companies established in 1998
Government-owned companies of China
Chinese brands
Companies in the CSI 100 Index
Drink companies of China